Peter Harry Lewis Croker (21 December 1921 – 7 December 2011) was an English footballer, who played as a full-back in the Football League for Charlton Athletic and Watford and in non-league football for Bromley and Gravesend & Northfleet. Prior to his death, he was the last survivor from Charlton's 1947 FA Cup Final-winning team. He missed the 1946 FA Cup Final through injury.

Coaching and administrative career 
Beginning in 1956, Croker served Charlton Athletic as youth team manager, scout and assistant manager. He also scouted for Blackpool and Sunderland and later became chairman of the South East Counties League.

Personal life 
His great nephew Eric Dier is also a professional footballer. His brother Ted Croker was the Secretary of The Football Association between 1973 and 1989. At the time of his retirement in May 1994, Croker had been working as a solicitor. Peter Croker died two weeks before his 90th birthday.

Honours

Club 
Charlton Athletic

 FA Cup: 1946–47

References

1921 births
2011 deaths
English footballers
Footballers from Kingston upon Thames
Association football fullbacks
Bromley F.C. players
Charlton Athletic F.C. players
Watford F.C. players
Ebbsfleet United F.C. players
English Football League players
Brentford F.C. wartime guest players
English solicitors
Leyland Motors F.C. players
Charlton Athletic F.C. non-playing staff
Blackpool F.C. non-playing staff
Sunderland A.F.C. non-playing staff
English football chairmen and investors
20th-century English lawyers
FA Cup Final players
20th-century English businesspeople